Haplochromis crebridens is a species of cichlid endemic to Lake Kivu on the border of the Democratic Republic of the Congo and Rwanda.  This species grows to a length of  SL.

References

crebridens
Fish described in 1990
Taxonomy articles created by Polbot